W710 is a mobile phone produced by Sony Ericsson.

The W710 was announced on May 18, 2006. It is one of two clamshell Walkman-brand phones, and shares many characteristics of the Z710. The W710 is a quad-band EDGE phone.

Other noticeable features include a full function internet browser, 2 MP digital camera, Memory Stick Micro (M2) slot, special functions for fitness and running, and a flight mode where cell phone functions are turned off. This allows for use of the Walkman, FM radio, and organizer functions in no cell-phone areas. The phone supports MP3, AAC, AAC+, and eAAC audio and MPEG4 and 3GPP video media formats.

The generic W710 is white with gray rubber and orange trim. There is also a version with purple rubber trim.

Key Features 
Dual Screens
2-megapixel camera with 2.5 x zoom
Walkman Music Player
FM Radio
3GP/MP4 Player
Bluetooth Technology
Quad Band Technology (GSM 850, GSM 900, GSM 1800 & GSM 1900)
Fitness Applications

Variants
 W710i - Primarily for the European and North American markets.
 W710c - For the Chinese market.

Sony Ericsson W710i Specifications 
Screen
Internal 262k TFT Colour Screen (176 x 220 Pixels)
External STN 4 Greyscale Screen (128 x 128 Pixels)
Imaging
2 Megapixel Camera
2.5 x Digital Zoom
Video Clip
Video Record
Video Streaming
Digital Camera Menu
Macromedia Flash Lite
Picture Editor
Picture Effects
Picture Phone Book
Picture Wallpaper
SVG Tiny 1.1
Image Blogging
Screensaver
Themes Display
VideoDJ
Viewfinder Display
Wallpaper Animation
Messaging
SMS (Text Messaging)
MMS (Multimedia Messaging)
SMS Long
MMS Video
Email
Push Email
Predictive Text
Sound Recorder
Sound
Walkman Music Player
Media Player
FM Radio RDS
Music Tones (MP3 & AAC)
Polyphonic Ringtones (16 Voice)
Polyphonic Sound (72 Voice)
MusicDJ
PlayNow
Mega Bass
Music Mode
Entertainment
3D Games
Java Games
Embedded Games
Downloadable Games
Organiser
Phone Book
Contacts
File Manager
PIM Sync
Alarm Clock
Business Card Exchange
Calendar
Calculator
Stopwatch
Tasks
Timer
Notes
Calorie Counter
Step Counter
Fitness Applications
Flight Mode
Vibrating Alert
Conference Calls
Handsfree Speakerphone
Connectivity
Bluetooth
GPRS
Infra Red
USB
EDGE
Fast Port
Synchronisation PC
Bluetooth stereo streaming
Network
Quad Band Technology (GSM 850, GSM 900, GSM 1800 & GSM 1900)
Internet
Modem
Access NetFront Web Browser
RSS Feeds
Memory & Talk Time
10 MB Memory Plus Memory Stick PRO Duo M2
10 Hours Talk Time
350 Hours Standby
Weight & Size
101 g
88 x 48 x 24.5 mm

Hidden Icons
As with most Sony Ericsson phones, the W710 contains several hidden icons, or smileys, for use in SMS messages;
 :-*   Smiley kiss
 :-]   Large smile
 :-[   Large frown
 [:]   Box smiley

External links
 Most Popular Bluetooth Speakerphone Models and Reviews
 Official W710 page
 Index of Reviews for W710

W710
Mobile phones introduced in 2006
Mobile phones with infrared transmitter